Tropic was [[The Miami Herald|The Miami Herald'''s]] Sunday magazine, published as an insert in the Sunday edition from 1967 until 1998. Tropic won three Pulitzer Prizes and published many writers who went on to become well known. More notable writers include humour columnists Dave Barry, Gene Weingarten, Carl Hiaasen, and Madeleine Blais. Other writers include Paul Levine, Joel Achenbach, Bill Cosford, and Tom Shroder.TropicFan.com

The magazine created the Tropic Hunt, now known as the Herald Hunt.

See also
Sunday magazinesThe Miami Herald''

References

1967 establishments in Florida
1998 disestablishments in Florida
Defunct magazines published in the United States
Magazines established in 1967
Magazines disestablished in 1998
Magazines published in Florida
Newspaper supplements
Weekly magazines published in the United States
Sunday magazines